The Devon is a traditional British breed of beef cattle. It originated in, and is named for, the county of Devon in the West Country of England. It is a deep rich red in colour, and so may be known as the Devon Ruby or Red Ruby; it may also be called the North Devon to distinguish it from the South Devon.

History 

The Devon is a traditional breed of the county of Devon in the West Country of England.

A herd-book was started by John Tanner Davy in 1850. A breed society, the Devon Cattle Breeders' Society, was formed in 1884, and took over management of the herd-book.

By the early twentieth century the Devon was widespread. A census in 1908 found a population of close to 500,000, outnumbered only by the Shorthorn – of which there were about ten times that number.

In the United States

In Australia 
Devons were popular for use in bullock teams for hauling cedar and other logs from the forests, which was pit sawn and then transported by bullock drawn wagons and timber junkers to towns and seaports for cabinet making or export. These cattle were among the earliest breeds in Australia and Devons were noted for their docility, early maturing, hardiness and strength which were important attributes to have in a team.

Characteristics

References

Further reading 

 Clive Thornton, (1993). Red Rubies: A History of the Devon Breed of Cattle, Manchester: Gabriel Communications.  .
 Philip Walling (2018). Till the Cows Come Home: The Story of Our Eternal Dependence, Chapter 11
 Albert Beer, Sean Beer (1998). Red  Rubies: Jewels  in  Exmoor's  Crown. Exmoor Magazine, Issue No 4, Autumn 1998, pages 16–18.
 J. Sinclair (1893). History of the Devon Breed of Cattle, London.
 John Tanner Davy (1869). A Short History of the Rise and Progress of the Devon Breed of Cattle, Journal of the Royal Agricultural Society of England, Vol. 30, pp. 107–130. 
 Richard Trevor Wilson (2012). The Rise, Fall and Restoration of a Native Breed of Domestic Cattle: The Devon Red Ruby of Southwest England. In: L. Marin and D. Kovač (editors) (2012). Native Species, Nova Science Publishers, Inc., pages 57–83. 

Cattle breeds originating in England
Conservation Priority Breeds of the Livestock Conservancy
Cattle breeds
Red cattle